Khvajeh Anvar (also Romanized as Khvājeh Anvar; also known as Khājawar, Khajeh Anvar, and Khvājehvar) is a village in Donbaleh Rud-e Shomali Rural District, Dehdez District, Izeh County, Khuzestan Province, Iran. At the 2006 census, its population was 148, in 22 families.

References 

Populated places in Izeh County